Ruby is an American reality-documentary television series on Style. The series debuted on November 9, 2008 and follows the life of Ruby Gettinger who lives in Savannah, Georgia as she attempts to lose weight. On December 12, 2012, it was announced that Style has passed on a fifth season order of the series and it has since been cancelled. Ruby returned with new episodes October 12, 2022 on a streaming platform with FarmDaze productions. Now titled The Ruby Show, 3 episodes are posted each week.

Synopsis
Gettinger starts the show weighing more than 550lbs (she originally weighed over 750lbs.) Ruby works with nutritionists, doctors, and trainers to lose weight, all the while commenting honestly and often humorously about the experience. The show also deals with the everyday life issues a morbidly obese person can face, such as the difficulty in using airplane bathrooms.

The first season featured one one-hour episode and eight half-hour episodes. The second season featured the same number of episodes as the first season, with mostly half-hour episodes, and a few one-hour episodes. The third season was the first season to feature all one-hour episodes. As of May 2, 2010, the third season featured all hour-long episodes, minus the season finale, which was two hours, plus one special, Ruby: My Australian Adventure. The fourth season featured all hour-long episodes, including the pre-season special: Ruby: My Naked Truth.

Episodes

Series overview

Season 1 (2008–09)

Season 2 (2009)

Season 3 (2010)
This is first season to not feature episodes shorter than an hour

Season 4 (2011)

References

2000s American reality television series
2010s American reality television series
2008 American television series debuts
2011 American television series endings
English-language television shows
Style Network original programming